The Faculty of Arts and Sciences is a division of Yale College that acts as a College of Arts and Sciences. It consists of four divisions, humanities, social sciences, sciences and engineering and applied sciences. (Ref 2 says "The FAS spans three broad intellectual areas, represented by the divisions of Humanities, Social Science, and Science. ") FAS faculty are represented by an elected 22 member senate who liaise between the faculty and university administration.

References

Yale College